Tororo is a town in the Eastern Region of Uganda. It is the main municipal, administrative, and commercial center of Tororo District.

History
Tororo was garrisoned by the Uganda Army's Air and Sea Battalion during the Uganda–Tanzania War (1978–79). On 2 March 1979, rebels loyal to Milton Obote attacked the town, whereupon part of the garrison defected while the rest was routed. Tororo was recaptured by the Uganda Army in a counter-attack two days later, though many local civilians were displaced by the fighting. A few weeks later, however, Ugandan President Idi Amin's rule throughout Uganda collapsed and the garrison of Tororo reportedly mutinied yet again. In late April 1979, the Tanzania People's Defence Force's (TPDF) 19th Battalion, 208th Brigade, moved into Tororo. They encountered no resistance. The town was largely deserted and completely looted. Journalists Tony Avirgan and Martha Honey stated that the local UA garrison had fled the city, whereas Tom Cooper and Adrien Fontanellaz claimed that the mutinous troops helped the anti-Amin forces to secure the town.

Tororo was captured by the National Resistance Army from the Uganda National Liberation Army (UNLA) in early February 1986 during the Ugandan Bush War. The UNLA counter-attacked in an attempt to retake Tororo and turn the tide in the war, but was repelled.

Location
The geographical coordinates of the town are 0°41'34.0"N, 34°10'54.0"E (Latitude:0.692780; Longitude:34.181655).

Population
In 2002, the national census put the population of the town of Tororo at 34,810. In 2010, the Uganda Bureau of Statistics (UBOS) estimated the population at 42,500. In 2011, UBOS estimated the mid-year population at 43,700. The 2014 national population census put the population at 41,906.

In 2015, the population of the town was projected at 43,100. In 2020, the mid-year population of Tororo Town was projected at 48,500. It was calculated that the population of this municipality grew at an average annual rate of 2.5 percent, between 2015 and 2020.

Industry

Tororo is home to three cement factories thus making Tororo the biggest producer of cement in the country. Tororo Cement Limited is the largest cement producer with 3 million tons produced annually. Tororo cement also produces nails, iron sheets, wire mesh among others.

Larfage has also established their Hima Cement factory in Tororo producing a variety of cement brands.

Tororo has National cement company Uganda Limited (Simba brand), inaugurated in August 2018 and producing 2000 metric tonnes daily.

It is also home to SEBA Foods, a food factory that was officially opened by the president of Uganda on 25 June 2010.

Electromaxx Limited constructed a 20 megawatt thermal plant, Tororo Power Station, which was commissioned in June 2010.

Tororo is also the location of Nilefos Minerals Limited, a subsidiary of the Madhvani Group of companies. Nilefos mines and processes phosphates for use in fertilizer and related industries.

Rail transport

Tororo marks the junction of railway lines to Pakwach, via Soroti, and to Kasese, via Kampala. Since 1993, the metre gauge line from Tororo Junction to Gulu and Pakwach has been out of use.

Rift Valley Railways funded the clearing of the line east to Gulu of vegetation and repairing track and bridges, thus allowing the first commercial train for 20 years to run through on the metre gauge track from the Kenyan port of Mombasa through Nairobi and Eldoret to the Kenyan frontier in Tororo and onwards to Gulu on the line to Pakwach on 14 September 2013.

Climate
Tororo has many thunderstorms and may be the place where thunder occurs on more days than any other place on Earth. From September to December there is rain most days in the late afternoon. The drier and hotter season starts in December.

Points of interest
The following additional points of interest lie within the town limits or near its edges:

1. The tourist attraction of the town is the dominating rock outcrop that overlooks the town known as Tororo Rock. It is a hike that takes around an hour to the top. There used to be a cable car that took people to the top but this was closed down after a couple of people died in an accident. There is a fee for a tour guide at the bottom of the rock, just off the golf course.

2. There is a golf course in town with a clubhouse with a pool

3. Offices of Tororo Town Council

4. The Tororo central market was knocked down in September 2017, to make way for a new indoor shopping centre that was predicted to be finished in 2020. This has led to a new market starting nearby in Water Village.

5. Tororo General Hospital, a 200-bed public hospital administered by the Uganda Ministry of Health.

6. Uganda Martyrs' Cathedral, the seat of the archbishop of the Roman Catholic Archdiocese of Tororo

7. St. Anthony's Hospital (Uganda), a 150-bed mission hospital affiliated with the Roman Catholic Archdiocese of Tororo

8. Christ the King Priory, a Benedictine monastery of the Congregation of Missionary Benedictines of Saint Ottilien

9.

10. Tororo Airport, a public airport administered by the Civil Aviation Authority of Uganda

11. Tororo Solar Power Station

12.

13. A mobile branch of PostBank Uganda

14. Branch of the National Social Security Fund.

Photos
  Photo of Tororo Rock 2
 Photo of Tororo Cement Works
 Photo of Rock Garden Hotel, Tororo
  Photo of Downtown Tororo

See also 
 Railway stations in Uganda
 Transport in Uganda
 Uganda Salvation Front
 List of cities and towns in Uganda

References

Works cited

External links 

 
Tororo District
Populated places in Eastern Region, Uganda